Princess Anna Sophie of Schwarzburg-Rudolstadt (9 September 1700 – 11 December 1780) was a Princess of Schwarzburg-Rudolstadt.

She was the daughter of Louis Frederick I, Prince of Schwarzburg-Rudolstadt (15 October 1667 – 24 June 1718) and Anna Sophie of Saxe-Gotha-Altenburg (1670–1728).

Family
On 2 January 1723 in Rudolstadt, she married Franz Josias, Duke of Saxe-Coburg-Saalfeld.  They had the following children:
 Ernest Frederick, Duke of Saxe-Coburg-Saalfeld (Saalfeld, 8 March 1724 – Coburg, 8 September 1800); great-grandfather of King Leopold II of Belgium, Carlota of Mexico, Queen Victoria, and Prince Albert.
 Prince Johann Wilhelm of Saxe-Coburg-Saalfeld (Coburg, 11 May 1726 – Hohenfriedberg, 4 June 1745); killed in battle.
 Princess Anna Sophia of Saxe-Coburg-Saalfeld (Coburg, 3 September 1727 – Coburg, 10 November 1728)
 Prince Christian Franz of Saxe-Coburg-Saalfeld (Coburg, 25 January 1730 – Coburg, 18 September 1797)
 Princess Charlotte Sophie of Saxe-Coburg-Saalfeld (Coburg, 24 September 1731 – Schwerin, 2 August 1810); married on 13 May 1755 Duke Ludwig of Mecklenburg-Schwerin.
 Princess Friederike Magdalene of Saxe-Coburg-Saalfeld (Coburg, 21 August 1733 – Coburg, 29 March 1734)
 Princess Friederike Caroline of Saxe-Coburg-Saalfeld (Coburg, 24 June 1735 – Schloß Schwaningen, 18 February 1791), married on 22 November 1754 Karl Alexander, Margrave of Brandenburg-Ansbach.
 Prince Friedrich Josias of Saxe-Coburg-Saalfeld (Ehrenburg Palace, Coburg, 26 December 1737 – Coburg, 26 February 1815)

Ancestry

|-

1700 births
1780 deaths
Duchesses of Saxe-Coburg-Saalfeld
Princesses of Schwarzburg
Daughters of monarchs